Manika was an ancient town in Euboea Greece, dating to the Early Helladic period II (2800–2200 BC).  The settlement covered an area of 50–80 hectares, and was inhabited by 6,000–13,500-15,000 people according to estimates. It was one of the largest settlements of the Bronze Age in Greece.

See also
 Cycladic civilization
 Minoan civilization

References

Cities in ancient Greece
Euboea
Aegean palaces of the Bronze Age
Former populated places in Greece
Helladic civilization